Fantcha (born Francelina Durão Almeida on October 14, 1965) is a Cape Verdean singer.

Biography
Fantcha was born as Francelina Durão Almeida  in chã De Alecrim  on São Vicente Island, Cape Verde.  She grew up singing in a musically rich household. From the earliest age, she loved to sing. Instead of playing with dolls or hopscotch with her little girlfriends, her biggest pleasure was to sing with her two brothers who enjoyed playing guitar and cavaquinho at home.

When she was around 10, Fantcha joined the Flores do Mindelo carnival company. Like in Brazil, carnival is one of the most important social event in Mindelo. Gregorio Gonçalves, a.k.a. Ti Goy, at that time one of the most famous composers in the city, was the Flores do Mindelo music director. Soon he realized that this young shrill-voiced girl had a timbre that people would notice, a voice that would make the difference in the tough competition the carnival companies were indulged in. But, besides her voice and her look, Ti Goy detected in her a promising talent: he told her that she should become a singer and offered her some training lessons. Years later, Ti Goy introduced Fantcha to Cesária Évora; she also became a friend of Cesaria’s daughter Fernanda, who was Fantcha’s age. She started to visit Cesaria regularly and learned a lot from her: Ti Goy – who had previously trained Cesaria – taught her the rules of the rhythm while Cesaria taught her the vibes, the emotion and the phrasing. Early 1988 – the same year Cesaria was recording an album that changed her destiny – Fantcha was in Lisbon, recording for Bana, the famous Capeverdean singer who lived in Portugal. That year, she went to the US, at the Massachusetts Capeverdean community’s invitation, for a concert series in the company of Cesaria Evora. Fantcha finally decided to stay in the US and now lives in New York.

Fantcha’s music has continued to evolve through several albums including, Lusafrica’s Criolinha and Viva Mindelo and the compilation album Putamayo Presents Cape Verde where she performed alongside famed Cape Verdean vocalists such as Bana and Cesaria Evora.  She also performed with Évora and Ildo Lobo in a Paris concert on March 23, 1998. She has toured throughout Cape Verde, Europe and the US and has performed at the Hollywood Bowl, Chicago World Music Festival, New York’s Summerstage and Joe’s Pub among others. A charismatic performer, Fantcha, developed her own, unique musical style with African, Cuban and Portuguese inflections. Her rich, sensuous voice is memorable when she sings the soulful mornas, evoking the ache of longing and loss. She is equally compelling with her renditions of coladeras, those danceable tunes that time after time has audiences on their feet dancing. 
Fantcha launched her next album Amor Mar e Musica at Joes Pub in March 2010. Under the musical direction of Rufino “Bau” Almeida, the album features top-notch musicians such as Hernani Almeida, Paulino Vieira, Miroca Paris, Cau Paris and Tchenta Neves. The album features many of Cape Verde's great composers including Betú, Constantino Cardoso, Teófilo Chantre, Jorge Humberto, Dionísio Maio, Manuel de Novas, Morgadinho, Eugénio Tavares and Vlú. The poignant title song, Amor Mar e Musica, was written by Fantcha herself.
In December 2016, Fantcha launched a new album entitled Nôs Caminhada, in hommage to her mentor Cesaria Evora, including a number of traditional songs (mornas and coladeras) that had been interpreted by Cesaria Evora. It also features compositions by Teofilo Chantre, Betú and a very special song, Nôs Caminhada, remember the moments spent with the beloved one Fantcha considers her second mom.

Discography
Boa Viagem (Portugal, 1988)
Criolinha (Lusafrica, 1997)
Viva Mindelo (Lusafrica, 2001)
Amor Mar e Musica (RB Records, 2009)
Nôs Caminhada (RAJ'D, 2016)

References

External links
Fantcha's official website

Fantcha - Biography at MTV
Fantcha at Sodade Online
Fantcha at Mindelo Infos website
Lusafrica records profile at Fantcha 

1965 births
Living people
21st-century Cape Verdean women singers
People from Mindelo
Singers from São Vicente, Cape Verde
20th-century Cape Verdean women singers